Charles Clark Gonzaga may refer to:

 Carlo Gonzaga of Milan (died 1456), Lord of Sabbioneta
 Carlo Gonzaga (condottiero) (1525–1566), Italian military leader
 Carlo I Gonzaga, or Charles I, Duke of Mantua (1580–1637), Lord of Montferrat, Duke of Nevers, Duke of Mayenne
 Charles II Gonzaga, (1609–1631), son of Carlo I, married to Maria Gonzaga
 Charles III, Duke of Mantua and Montferrat (1629–1665), son of Charles II
 Charles IV, Duke of Mantua and Montferrat (1652–1708), son of Charles III, last ruler of Mantua